Prince Karl Gero Albrecht Joseph Wilhelm Anton Maria of Urach, Count of Württemberg, 3rd Duke of Urach (19 August 1899 – 15 August 1981), sometimes referred to as Vytautas II, was the head of the morganatic Urach branch of the House of Württemberg. He was also the second successor to the defunct Lithuanian throne upon the death of his uncrowned father, Lithuanian King-elect Mindaugas II.

Life
He was born in Lichtenstein, then part of the Kingdom of Württemberg, at his family's Lichtenstein Castle, being the second son of Duke Wilhelm of Urach and his first wife Duchess Amalie in Bavaria.

In 1917 he graduated from the Karls-Gymnasium school in Stuttgart. After graduation he served in the First World War as a lieutenant. He was heavily wounded in 1918. After the war Karl Gero von Urach studied architecture, and later worked as an architect in Munich.

In 1928, on his father's death, Karl Gero became the third Duke (Herzog) of Urach, as his elder brother Wilhelm had resolved to marry morganatically (he was a director at Mercedes Benz for most of his life, and had two daughters).

In 1935 he entered Wehrmacht and became a Hauptmann, and in 1940 was promoted to Major. Until 1945 he was based at the local army headquarters at Tübingen and Ulm.

On 20 June 1940 Karl Gero von Urach married Countess Gabriele of Waldburg zu Zeil und Trauchburg (1910–2005). The marriage was childless. Karl Gero von Urach died at Lichtenstein Castle on 15 August 1981, and his nephew Karl Anselm succeeded to the Dukedom.

Ancestry

References
 Hauptstaatsarchiv Stuttgart – Bestand GU 126 – Karl Gero Herzog von Urach (1899–1981)

External links
Website of the Urach family 

 

1899 births
1981 deaths
People from Reutlingen (district)
Dukes of Urach
People from the Kingdom of Württemberg
German Roman Catholics
Karl Gero
German Army personnel of World War I
German Army officers of World War II
Military personnel from Baden-Württemberg